Salaheldin Mahmoud Nemer (born 5 February 1992) is a Sudanese footballer who plays as a centre-back for Al-Merreikh and the Sudan national team.

References

1992 births
Living people
Sudanese footballers
Association football central defenders
Al Khartoum SC players
Al-Merrikh SC players
Sudan international footballers
2021 Africa Cup of Nations players
Sudan A' international footballers
2022 African Nations Championship players